Carlisle Tithe Barn is an historic building in Carlisle, Cumbria. It is a Grade I listed building, listed on 1 June 1949.

History and description
The tithe barn was built about the 1470s for Prior Gondibour, as part of the Priory of St Mary. After the Dissolution of the Monasteries the priory church was refounded as Carlisle Cathedral; the barn  was subsequently used for various purposes, including stable and dispensary.

The north side of the barn is thought to have been open originally. Internally, oak roof trusses are supported on each side by large timber posts.

There were modifications in 1824, when the building was adapted for use as a dispensary. In 1875 parts of the west end, in danger of collapse, were dismantled. The building was semi-derelict before purchase and restoration by St Cuthbert's Church in 1969–71; it has since been the church hall, and venue for social events.

See also
 Grade I listed buildings in Cumbria
 Listed buildings in Carlisle, Cumbria

References

Grade I listed buildings in Cumbria
15th-century architecture in the United Kingdom
Buildings and structures in Carlisle, Cumbria
Tithe barns in Europe
Buildings and structures completed in the 15th century